Fletcha Scott Middleton (born 21 January 2002) is an English cricketer. He made his List A debut on 12 August 2021, for Hampshire in the 2021 Royal London One-Day Cup. He made his first-class debut on 13 May 2022, for Hampshire against the Sri Lanka Cricket Development XI side during their tour of England.

Personal life
He is the son of former Hampshire cricketer and batting coach Tony Middleton.

References

External links
 

2002 births
Living people
English cricketers
Hampshire cricketers
Cricketers from Winchester